A carrot cake cookie is a cookie prepared with ingredients that provide a flavor and texture similar to carrot cake.

Ingredients
Typical ingredients include grated carrot, flour, sugar or brown sugar, cooking oil, spices and baking soda. Additional ingredients may include shredded coconut, raisins, molasses and nuts. Many variations exist, such as carrot cake whoopie pies, cookie sandwiches, and those prepared in the style of an energy bar. Cream cheese is sometimes used as a topping or a filling in cookie sandwich varieties. Vegan versions may use vegan cream cheese as a substitute for dairy-based cream cheese.

See also

 Carrot bread
 List of carrot dishes
 List of cookies

References

Further reading
 

Cookies
Carrot dishes